Mathias Serin (born 1 August 1991) is a French professional footballer who plays as a midfielder for Championnat National 2 club Colomiers.

Club career
Serin began playing football in the youth system of Bordeaux. He played amateur football before turning professional with Ligue 1 club Angers at age 23.

After making his debut in the French lower divisions, Serin joined Angers in June 2015. He made his full professional debut a few months later, in a 1–0 Ligue 1 victory over Troyes, coming up as a late game substitute for Abdoul Camara.

After he left Angers, Serin played semi-pro football with Dunkerque, and the club's supporters chose him as player of the month for December 2017. One season later, he joined local rivals Boulogne. In November 2019 he left Boulogne for Le Puy.

References

External links
 
 Mathias Serin foot-national.com Profile
 
 

1991 births
Living people
Association football midfielders
French footballers
FC Girondins de Bordeaux players
LB Châteauroux players
SO Châtellerault players
FC Chartres players
SO Romorantin players
Angers SCO players
USL Dunkerque players
US Boulogne players
Le Puy Foot 43 Auvergne players
AS Béziers (2007) players
US Colomiers Football players
Championnat National 3 players
Championnat National 2 players
Ligue 1 players
Championnat National players